The women's 63 kilograms weightlifting event at the 2012 Summer Olympics in London, United Kingdom, took place at ExCeL London.

Summary
Total score was the sum of the lifter's best result in each of the snatch and the clean and jerk, with three lifts allowed for each lift.  In case of a tie, the lighter lifter won; if still tied, the lifter who took the fewest attempts to achieve the total score won.  Lifters without a valid snatch score did not perform the clean and jerk.

On 15 June 2016, it was announced that gold medalist Maiya Maneza had tested positive for performance-enhancing drugs at the 2012 Olympic competition. On 27 July 2016, the IWF reported in the second wave of re-sampling that silver medalist Svetlana Tsarukaeva had tested positive for the steroid dehydrochlormethyltestosterone. On 5 April 2017 it was announced that as a result of retesting samples she had been disqualified for a drug violation, and her silver medal withdrawn.

Schedule
All times are British Summer Time (UTC+01:00)

Records

Results

New records

References 

Results 

Weightlifting at the 2012 Summer Olympics
Olymp
Women's events at the 2012 Summer Olympics